Gordana Matic is a Croatian-American mathematician who works as a professor at the University of Georgia. Her research concerns low-dimensional topology and contact geometry.

Matic earned her doctorate from the University of Utah in 1986, under the supervision of Ronald J. Stern, and worked as a C.L.E. Moore instructor at the Massachusetts Institute of Technology before joining the University of Georgia faculty.

Matic was the Spring 2012 speaker in the University of Texas Distinguished Women in Mathematics Lecture Series. In 2014, she was elected as a fellow of the American Mathematical Society "for contributions to low-dimensional and contact topology."

References

External links
Home page

Year of birth missing (living people)
Living people
Croatian mathematicians
20th-century American mathematicians
21st-century American mathematicians
American women mathematicians
University of Utah alumni
University of Georgia faculty
Fellows of the American Mathematical Society
Yugoslav emigrants to the United States
Topologists
20th-century women mathematicians
21st-century women mathematicians
20th-century American women
21st-century American women